"Secret Place" may refer to:

Secret Place (album), an album by Neal Morse
A Secret Place, a 1976 album by Grover Washington, Jr
"Secret Place", a song by Trish Thuy Trang
"A Secret Place", a song from the 1997 Megadeth album Cryptic Writings
The Secret Place (film), a 1957 British crime film
"The Secret Place" (short story), a 1966 short story by Richard McKenna
The Secret Place (book), a 2014 novel by Tana French

See also
Secret Places, a 1984 British drama film